WBVB (97.1 FM, "B97") is a radio station broadcasting a classic hits radio format. Licensed to Coal Grove, Ohio, United States, the station serves the Huntington-Ashland area.  The station is currently owned by iHeartMedia, Inc.

History
The station was assigned call sign WZTX on August 18, 1988.  On November 29, 1989, the station changed its call sign to WXVK, and then on December 19, 1994, to the current WBVB.

On February 14, 2012, WBVB relaunched as "Oldies 97.1".

On January 1, 2016, WBVB shifted its format from oldies to classic hits, branded as "B97".

In January 2020, the hosts of WBVB's morning show, the Woody & Professor Show, were laid off as a part of iHeartMedia's realignment in small and medium radio markets.

References

External links

BVB
Classic hits radio stations in the United States
Radio stations established in 1990
IHeartMedia radio stations